The 1985–86 Edmonton Oilers season was the Oilers' seventh season in the NHL, and they were coming off back to back Stanley Cup Championships.  Edmonton won the inaugural Presidents' Trophy, as they finished with 119 points, which was a league high and tied the franchise record which was set in the 1983–84 season.  The Oilers won the Smythe Division for the 5th consecutive season, and were heavy favourites to win their third-straight Stanley Cup. It was also the fifth consecutive season in which they scored at least 400 goals. However, the Oilers were defeated by the Calgary Flames in the second round.

Regular season
During the season, the Oilers had to deal with some legal issues. Dave Hunter was convicted three times in a span of less than two years for impaired driving. Mark Messier had his automobile troubles too, getting a fine after hitting three parked cars with his Porsche. Finally, the Oilers signed Craig MacTavish, who had missed the 1984-85 NHL season while serving a year in jail for vehicular homicide. Despite these distractions, the Oilers still finished first overall in the NHL.

Wayne Gretzky set an NHL record by earning 215 points and 163 assists, breaking records that he had previously set, as he won his sixth Art Ross Trophy and his seventh Hart Trophy. Jari Kurri became the first Oiler other than Gretzky to lead the team in goals as he scored 68 goals, and added 63 assists to finish with 131 points. Paul Coffey set the record for most goals (48) by a defenceman, breaking the record of 46 goals that Bobby Orr had previously set while finishing the season with 138 points, which was one point behind Orr's all-time defenceman record of 139 points. He won his second straight Norris Trophy.

In goal, Grant Fuhr and Andy Moog once again split time, with Fuhr leading the team with 29 wins, while Moog posted a team best 3.69 GAA.

Season standings

Schedule and results

Playoffs
In the playoffs, the Oilers made quick work of the Vancouver Canucks in the opening round sweeping them in three straight games, setting up a matchup with their rivals the Calgary Flames, who swept the Winnipeg Jets in their opening round series, for another Battle of Alberta.  The Oilers could never seem to get on a roll against the Flames, as the series was pushed to the limit as they would meet for a seventh game in Edmonton.  With the score tied up at 2 late in the third period, Oilers defenceman Steve Smith was playing the puck behind the Edmonton goal, and attempted to make a pass, however it hit goalie Grant Fuhr and the puck ended up in the Oilers goal, giving the Flames a 3–2 lead.  Edmonton could not come back, as the Flames ended up winning the game, and the series, and ending the Oilers chance at winning a third Stanley Cup in a row.

Player statistics

Regular season
Scoring leaders

Goaltending

Playoffs
Scoring leaders

Goaltending

Awards and records

Awards
 Wayne Gretzky - Art Ross Trophy, Hart Trophy
 Paul Coffey - Norris Trophy

Records
266: An Oilers record for most penalty minutes in a single season by Kevin McClelland.
206: A new Oilers record for most penalty minutes in a single season by Kevin McClelland on February 11, 1986.
265: An Oilers record for most penalty minutes in a single season by a defenceman by Marty McSorley.
197: A new Oilers record for most penalty minutes in a single season by a defenceman by Marty McSorley on March 4, 1986.
215: An NHL record for most points in a single season by Wayne Gretzky.
213: A new NHL record for most points in a single season by Wayne Gretzky on April 4, 1986.
163: An NHL record for most assists in a single season by Wayne Gretzky.
136: A new NHL record for most assists in a single season by Wayne Gretzky on March 7, 1986.
48: An NHL record for most goals in a single season by a defenceman by Paul Coffey.
47: A new NHL record for most goals in a single season by a defenceman by Paul Coffey on April 2, 1986.
8: Tied NHL record for most career short-handed goals in a playoffs by Wayne Gretzky on April 24, 1986.

Milestones

Transactions

Trades

Free agents

Draft picks
Edmonton's draft picks at the 1985 NHL Entry Draft.

References

External links
SHRP Sports
The Internet Hockey Database
National Hockey League Guide & Record Book 2007

Edmonton Oilers season, 1985-86
Edmon
Edmonton Oilers seasons
Presidents' Trophy seasons
Smythe Division champion seasons